Anthony E. Parker (born December 4, 1975) is a former American football cornerback who played four seasons for the San Francisco 49ers. In 2003 he was signed by the Oakland Raiders but suffered a season ending injury. He was drafted in the fourth round with the 99th overall pick in the 1999 NFL Draft.

References

1975 births
Players of American football from Denver
American football cornerbacks
San Francisco 49ers players
Colorado Mesa Mavericks football players
Weber State Wildcats football players
Living people